The March 1969 nor'easter was an extratropical cyclone that moved into the Gulf of Mexico on March 5, moving through southern Georgia, then deepened as it moved along the lower Eastern Seaboard, before swinging wide of New England and Atlantic Canada.  Heavy snows fell across eastern Maryland, southern Delaware, and Martha's Vineyard in Massachusetts.   It was a strong system, with maximum sustained winds of  a central pressure close to  while south of Atlantic Canada.  The system then moved into the far northern Atlantic Ocean while splitting into two low pressure areas on March 10.

Evolution
Late on March 5, a frontal wave moved offshore Galveston, Texas. The system moved along the Gulf coast on March 6. Gale-force winds were confined to behind its prefrontal squall line on March 6. The cyclone tracked offshore New England. During the day, the cyclone absorbed a previously strong cyclone to its north near Anticosti Island. The system slowly weakened while moving slowly northeast offshore eastern Newfoundland on the 9th and 10th, losing hurricane-force winds on the 9th. The system split into two distinct low pressure centers on 10th as it approached southern Greenland.

Impact
The cyclone's pre-frontal squall line moved into western Florida between 4:30 and 6:00 p.m. on March 6. Damage caused was between $50,000 and $500,000. At Martha's Vineyard, heavy snow and winds up to  created snow drifts exceeding  in height.

References

Blizzards in the United States
Noreaster 1969-03
Noreaster 1969-03
Noreaster 1969-03
Nor'easters
Noreaster 1969-03
Noreaster
Noreaster 1969-03